Sébastien Tayac (born 4 December 1975) is a French gymnast. He finished in twenty-sixth place in the all around at the 1996 Summer Olympics.

References

External links
 

1975 births
Living people
French male artistic gymnasts
Olympic gymnasts of France
Gymnasts at the 1996 Summer Olympics
Sportspeople from Nice
20th-century French people